John Formosa is a former Australian rules footballer, who played for the Fitzroy Football Club in the Victorian Football League (VFL).

References

External links

Fitzroy Football Club players
Australian rules footballers from Victoria (Australia)
1954 births
Living people